Bruce Ira Harlan (January 2, 1926 – June 22, 1959) was a diver from the United States and Olympic champion. He represented his native country at the 1948 Summer Olympics in London, where he received one gold medal and one silver medal.

Harlan was a high school wrestler and pole vaulter in Lansdowne, Pennsylvania, and served in the United States Navy during World War II. Harlan coached diving at the University of Michigan from 1954 to 1959.  On June 21, 1959 he took part in a diving exhibition in Fairfield, Connecticut.  While helping to dismantle the scaffolding of the diving tower, Harlan fell  to his death.

In 1961 the Michigan Interscholastic Swim Coaches Association (MISCA) honored Bruce Harlan when they created an award in his honor. The award is given annually to a diving coach who demonstrates continued leadership, contributions, and service to Michigan High School Diving.

Harlan was inducted into the International Swimming Hall of Fame in 1973.

See also
 List of members of the International Swimming Hall of Fame

References

External links

 

1926 births
1959 deaths
Accidental deaths from falls
American male divers
Divers at the 1948 Summer Olympics
Medalists at the 1948 Summer Olympics
Michigan Wolverines diving coaches
Ohio State Buckeyes men's divers
Olympic gold medalists for the United States in diving
Sports deaths in Connecticut
Sportspeople from Delaware County, Pennsylvania
United States Navy personnel of World War II
Diving deaths
20th-century American people